Abelardo Luz is a Brazilian municipality in the state of Santa Catarina. Until 1958 it was part of the municipality  of Xanxerê. It is the birthplace of Brazilian former football player Paulo Roberto Falcão.

The municipality contains the  Mata Preta Ecological Station, a fully protected area created in 2005.

References

Municipalities in Santa Catarina (state)